Francis Boadi (born 23 November 1991) is a Ghanaian footballer who plays as a midfielder for Great Olympics in the Ghanaian Premiership.

Career
Boadi began his career with Great Olympics and was promoted to Ghana Premier League team in January 2006.

In December 2007, The Sun reported that Reading are to offer him a two-year scholarship. In July 2009 was linked with an possibly move to PFC CSKA Moscow and an club from Georgia. He is currently on trial in Serbian Superliga team Jagodina.

International 
Boadi was part of the Ghana side that beat Brazil at the Under-17 World Cup Finals held in South Korea between 18 August and 9 September 2007.

Honours 
2007 African Under-17 Championship - Third place, Bronze

References

1991 births
Living people
Ghanaian footballers
Association football midfielders
Accra Great Olympics F.C. players